The year 1925 was marked, in science fiction, by the following events.

Births and deaths

Births 
 January 22 : Katherine MacLean, American writer
 February 14 : J. T. McIntosh, Scottish writer (died 2008)
 March 12 : Harry Harrison, American writer (died 2012)
 June 9 :
 Bob Ottum, American writer (died 1986)
 Keith Laumer, American writer (died 1993)
 August 18 : Brian Aldiss, British writer (died 2017)
 Arkady Strugatsky, Russian writer (died 1991)

Deaths

Events

Awards 
The main science-fiction Awards known at the present time did not exist at this time.

Literary releases

Novels 
  Les Hommes frénétiques, by Ernest Pérochon
  Les Navigateurs de l'infini, by J.-H. Rosny aîné.
  Out of the Silence, by Erle Cox (publication as book ; the novel had been published in a magazine, each week during six months, in 1919).
  Heart of a Dog by Mikhail Bulgakov.
  The Fatal Eggs by Mikhail Bulgakov.
  Professor Dowell's Head by Alexander Belayev.

Stories collections

Comics

Audiovisual outputs

Movies 
 The Crazy Ray, by René Clair.
 Luch Smerti, by Lev Kuleshov.

See also 
 1925 in science
 1924 in science fiction
 1926 in science fiction

References

Science fiction by year

science-fiction